The Huff-Daland XHB-3 was a proposed heavy bomber envisaged by Huff-Daland in the late 1920s. The leadership of the United States Army Air Corps found the XHB-3 design too radical to be a real proposition, so the design remained a paper project only.

Specifications

See also

References

XHB-3
1920s United States bomber aircraft
High-wing aircraft